1703 Barry is a stony Flora asteroid, suspected tumbler and slow rotator from the inner regions of the asteroid belt, approximately 9.5 kilometer in diameter. Discovered in by Max Wolf in 1930, it was later named after Vincentian priest and astronomer Roger Barry.

Discovery 

Barry was discovered on 2 September 1930, by German astronomer Max Wolf at Heidelberg Observatory in southern Germany. In the same month, it was independently discovered by Dutch astronomer Hendrik van Gent and Soviet astronomer Evgenii Skvortsov at their observatories in Johannesburg and Crimea-Nauchnij, respectively.

Orbit and classification 

The relatively bright S-type asteroid is a member of the Flora family, one of the largest collisional groups in the main-belt. It orbits the Sun in the inner main-belt at a distance of 1.8–2.6 AU once every 3 years and 4 months (1,204 days). Its orbit has an eccentricity of 0.17 and an inclination of 5° with respect to the ecliptic. Its observation arc begins with its official discovery observation at Heidelberg.

Naming 

This minor planet was named after Vincentian priest Roger Barry (1752–1813), the Court Astronomer of Grand Duchy of Baden at the Mannheim Observatory in 1788. The Heidelberg Observatory is a direct successor to the old Mannheim Observatory. The official  was published by the Minor Planet Center on 20 February 1976.

Physical characteristics

Slow rotator 

While most asteroids rotate within 20 hours once around their axis, Barry belongs to the relatively small group of slow rotators with a period above 100 hours.

It may have a non-principal axis rotation. However, no follow-up measurements have since confirmed its tumbling motion.

Diameter and albedo 

According to the surveys carried out by the Infrared Astronomical Satellite IRAS, the Japanese Akari satellite, and NASA's Wide-field Infrared Survey Explorer with its subsequent NEOWISE mission, Barry measures between 9.21 and 9.50 kilometers in diameter and its surface has an albedo between 0.216 and 0.330, while the Collaborative Asteroid Lightcurve Link derives an albedo of 0.280 and a diameter of 9.54 kilometers with an absolute magnitude of 12.1.

References

External links 
 Asteroid Lightcurve Database (LCDB), query form (info )
 Dictionary of Minor Planet Names, Google books
 Asteroids and comets rotation curves, CdR – Observatoire de Genève, Raoul Behrend
 Discovery Circumstances: Numbered Minor Planets (1)-(5000) – Minor Planet Center
 
 

001703
Discoveries by Max Wolf
Named minor planets
001703
001703
19300902